The Tooele Transcript-Bulletin is a twice-weekly (Tuesday and Thursday) newspaper serving Tooele County, Utah and environs. The paper, originally called the Tooele Transcript, was purchased by James Dunn, a Scottish farmer and poet, in 1898 for $20. It has remained in the hands of the Dunn family for several generations since. In 1923, the paper acquired the rival The Tooele Bulletin, and began publishing under the Transcript-Bulletin name. The paper has won awards for editorial excellence over the years, and was named the best non-daily newspaper in Utah by the Society of Professional Journalists Utah Headliners in 2007, 2009 and 2010.

The newspaper's parent company, Transcript Bulletin Publishing, is a printing, publishing and design enterprise serving clients across the USA.

References

External links
 Tooele Transcript-Bulletin

Newspapers published in Utah
1898 establishments in Utah
Tooele County, Utah